Kadakh is a 2019 Indian Hindi-language black comedy drama film featuring Ranvir Shorey, Kalki Koechlin, Rajat Kapoor and Cyrus in the prominent roles. The film, directed by Kapoor, is set on a night of Deepawali celebration when a Mumbai based couple organise a party at their home only to face bizarre circumstances during the whole night.

Plot
Sunil is preparing for a Diwali party at his house. Some hours before the party he is visited by a stranger named Raghav, who introduces himself as husband of Sunil's colleague Chaya. Sunil is having an extramarital affair with Chaya and Raghav knows about that. Sunil and Raghav have an argument, during which Raghav accidentally shoots and kills himself with a gun. Before Sunil could do much to hide the body, his wife Malti returns from the office. Sunil tells her about the incident and while they're discussing what they should do, guests of the party start arriving. Having no way out, they hide the body and welcome the friends. Among the set of friends, there is Francoise Marie, who is a thought reader, a single mom named Paro and Joshi who is cooking for everyone in the party. There are unannounced guests as well, who are Malti's uncle and her aunt, Sunil's friend Rahul, Rahul's wife Sheetal, Yogesh and his wife Alka and Sunil's office colleagues and Chaya too; very soon the whole house is filled with people. What unfolds next is the hidden rivalry between friends, drunken brawls, game of cards and several twists and turns finally resulting in soiled friendships and ruined relationships.

Cast 

 Ranvir Shorey as Sunil
 Mansi Multani as Maalti
 Palomi Ghosh as Chhaya
 Chandrchoor Rai as Raaghav
 Rajat Kapoor as Rahul
 Kalki Koechlin as Francoise Marie
 Shruti Seth as Alka
 Nupur Asthana as Paaro
 Sagar Deshmukh as Joshi
 Tara Sharma as Sheetal (as Tara Sharma Saluja)
 Cyrus Sahukar as Yogesh
 Sheena Khalid as Sheena
 Kaizaad Kotwal as Kaizaad
 Krishna Raaz as Radha
 Minty Tejpal as Minty
 Manoj Pahwa as Maalti's Chacha
 Yamini Das as Maalti's chachi
 Brijesh Karanwal as Watchman

Production
The film was shot on a single location. Since the film is mostly set on the events of a single night, the shooting was done for 30 continuous nights in a studio of Andheri East, Mumbai. All the unit members actually slept in the day and worked at nights to complete the film.

Release
Kadakh premiered at the 2019 South Asian International Film Festival. It released on 18 June 2020 in India distributed by SonyLiv.

References

External links 
 
 Kadakh on Sony Liv

2019 films
Hindi-language comedy films
2019 black comedy films
Indian black comedy films
2010s Hindi-language films